Les goddams (sometimes  les goddems or les goddons) is an obsolete ethnic slur historically used by the French to refer to the English, based on their frequent expletives. The name originated during the Hundred Years War (1337–1453) between England and France, when English soldiers were notorious among the French for their frequent use of profanity and in particular the interjection "God damn".

Outside France, the name has been used in French-speaking parts of Canada. Related terms have existed outside the French-speaking world: Godames was historically used in Brazil, while Gotama was used in East Africa.

References

External links

Pejorative terms for European people
French slang
French profanity
Hundred Years' War